WNYL-LP (104.9 FM) is a defunct radio station formerly licensed to serve Lima, New York. The station was owned by Elim Gospel Church of Lima New York. It aired a Christian Contemporary music format.

The station was assigned the WNYL-LP call letters by the Federal Communications Commission (FCC) on February 11, 2005.

WNYL-LP went silent April 18, 2007, due to what the station's engineer reports as "unacceptable co-channel interference" as a result of a frequency change by WMJQ (now WKDL) in nearby Brockport, New York. The station informed the FCC that they were negotiating with property owners for a new antenna site and would apply for a new frequency once an acceptable site had been secured. The station's license was cancelled and its call sign deleted from the FCC's database on October 29, 2010.

References

External links
Elim Gospel Church
 
WNYL-LP service area per the FCC database

Defunct religious radio stations in the United States
NYL-LP
NYL-LP
Livingston County, New York
Radio stations disestablished in 2010
Defunct radio stations in the United States
Radio stations established in 2005
2005 establishments in New York (state)
2010 disestablishments in New York (state)
NYL-LP